The 2006–07 Welcoat Dragons season was the first season of the franchise in the Philippine Basketball Association (PBA).

Newest member
Welcoat bought the Pilipinas Shell franchise early in the year. The team is co-owned by Raymund Yu and Terry Que and the ballclub in their first season will be known as Welcoat Dragons.

Key dates
August 20: The 2006 PBA Draft took place in Fort Bonifacio, Taguig.

Draft picks

Roster

Philippine Cup

Game log

|- bgcolor="#edbebf" 
| 1
| October 1
| Brgy.Ginebra
| 69-102
|  Lopez (12)
| 
| 
| Araneta Coliseum
| 0–1
|- bgcolor="#bbffbb" 
| 2
| October 8
| Coca Cola
| 85-75
| Reyes (16)
| 
| 
| Araneta Coliseum
| 1–1
|- bgcolor="#edbebf" 
| 3
| October 13
| Talk 'N Text
| 99-115
| Lopez (21)
| 
| 
| Cuneta Astrodome
| 1–2
|- bgcolor="#bbffbb"
| 4
| October 15
| San Miguel
| 96-88
| Tangkay (18)
| 
| 
| Araneta Coliseum
| 2–2
|- bgcolor="#edbebf"
| 5
| October 22
| Air21
| 94-110
| Tangkay (15)
| 
| 
| Cuneta Astrodome
| 2–3
|- bgcolor="#edbebf" 
| 6
| October 27
| Red Bull
| 77-80
| Cabatu (22)
| 
| 
| Araneta Coliseum
| 2–4
|- bgcolor="#edbebf" 
| 7
| October 29
| Coca Cola
| 86-92
| Tangkay (25)
| 
| 
| Araneta Coliseum
| 2–5

|- bgcolor="#edbebf" 
| 8
| November 4
| Sta.Lucia
| 83-89
| Wainwright (17)
| 
| 
| The Arena in San Juan
| 2–6
|- bgcolor="#bbffbb" 
| 9
| November 9
| Talk 'N Text
| 79-72
| 
| 
| 
| Lanao del Norte
| 3–6
|- bgcolor="#edbebf" 
| 10
| November 12
| Purefoods
| 84-86
| Gelig (22)
| 
| 
| Araneta Coliseum
| 3–7
|- bgcolor="#edbebf" 
| 11
| November 17
| Alaska
| 91-97 OT
| Lopez (20)
| 
| 
| Araneta Coliseum
| 3–8
|- bgcolor="#edbebf" 
| 12
| November 22
| Air21
| 85-100
| Tangkay (16)
| 
| 
| Araneta Coliseum
| 3–9
|- bgcolor="#edbebf" 
| 13
| November 29
| Brgy.Ginebra
| 66-87
| Lopez (21)
| 
| 
| Araneta Coliseum
| 3–10

|- bgcolor="#edbebf" 
| 14
| December 1
| Purefoods
| 74-76
| Reyes (14)
| 
| 
| Araneta Coliseum
| 3–11
|- bgcolor="#edbebf" 
| 15
| December 6
| Red Bull
| 78-97
| Reyes (18)
| 
| 
| Araneta Coliseum
| 3–12
|- bgcolor="#edbebf" 
| 16
| December 10
| Sta.Lucia
| 82-98
| Reyes (19)
| 
| 
| Cuneta Astrodome
| 3–13
|- bgcolor="#edbebf" 
| 17
| December 13
| San Miguel
| 85-97
| Reyes (15)
| 
| 
| Araneta Coliseum
| 3–14
|- bgcolor="#edbebf" 
| 18
| December 20
| Alaska
| 90-96
| Reyes (26)
| 
| 
| Araneta Coliseum
| 3–15

Fiesta Conference

Game log

|- bgcolor="#edbebf" 
| 1
| March 4
| Coca Cola
| 79-81
|  Reyes (25)
| 
| 
| Cuneta Astrodome
| 0–1
|- bgcolor="#bbffbb" 
| 2
| March 11
| Sta.Lucia
| 114-104
| Clark (37)
| 
| 
| Araneta Coliseum
| 1–1
|- bgcolor="#edbebf" 
| 3
| March 16
| Brgy.Ginebra
| 97-99
| Clark (26)
| 
| 
| Araneta Coliseum
| 1–2
|- bgcolor="#edbebf"
| 4
| March 21
| Alaska
| 78-99
| Clark (29)
| 
| 
| Araneta Coliseum
| 1–3
|- bgcolor="#edbebf"
| 5
| March 24
| Talk 'N Text
| 78-100
| Clark (33)
| 
| 
| Cabanatuan
| 1–4
|- bgcolor="#bbffbb" 
| 6
| March 30
| Air21
| 103-99
| Clark (40)
| 
| 
| Araneta Coliseum
| 2–4

|- bgcolor="#edbebf" 
| 7
| April 8
| Purefoods
| 82-94
| Compton (24)
| 
| 
| Araneta Coliseum
| 2–5
|- bgcolor="#edbebf" 
| 8
| April 15
| San Miguel
| 90-96
| Sanders (29)
| 
| 
| Araneta Coliseum
| 2–6
|- bgcolor="#edbebf" 
| 9
| April 18
| Red Bull
| 71-100
| 
| 
| 
| Araneta Coliseum
| 2–7
|- bgcolor="#edbebf" 
| 10
| April 22
| Air21
| 94-102
| Compton (38)
| 
| 
| Araneta Coliseum
| 2–8

|- bgcolor="#edbebf" 
| 11
| May 2
| Brgy.Ginebra
| 71-103
| Reyes (20)
| 
| 
| Araneta Coliseum
| 2–9
|- bgcolor="#edbebf" 
| 12
| May 6
| Alaska
| 66-74
| White (18)
| 
| 
| Araneta Coliseum
| 2–10
|- bgcolor="#bbffbb" 
| 13
| May 10
| Talk 'N Text
| 98-88
| White (31)
| 
| 
| The Arena in San Juan
| 3–10
|- bgcolor="#edbebf" 
| 14
| May 16
| Sta.Lucia
| 104-112 (2OT)
| White (33)
| 
| 
| Araneta Coliseum
| 3–11
|- bgcolor="#edbebf" 
| 15
| May 18
| Red Bull
| 81-103
| White, Compton, Reyes (14)
| 
| 
| Araneta Coliseum
| 3–12
|- bgcolor="#edbebf" 
| 16
| May 23
| San Miguel
| 79-119
| White (29)
| 
| 
| Ynares Center
| 3–13
|- bgcolor="#bbffbb" 
| 17
| May 25
| Coca Cola
| 86-80
| Compton (21)
| 
| 
| Ynares Center
| 4–13

|- bgcolor="#edbebf" 
| 18
| June 1
| Purefoods
| 97-109
| White (30)
| White (11)
| 
| Ynares Center
| 4–14

References

Rain or Shine Elasto Painters seasons
Welcoat